Wendell L. Roelofs (born July 26, 1938) was the first researcher to characterize insect sex pheromone structures, developing microchemical techniques for the isolation and identification of pheromone components.

Education and career 
Roelofs obtained his BS in chemistry in 1960 from Central College in Pella, Iowa and his PhD in organic chemistry from Indiana University in 1964. He is the Liberty Hyde Bailey Professor of Insect Biochemistry in the Department of Entomology at Cornell University in Ithaca, New York.

Award 
Roelofs received the National Medal of Science from President Ronald Reagan in 1983.

References

 (letter to the editor)

 Sound recording, on side 2 of 1 cassette

External links
Roelofs homepage at Cornell University

1938 births
Living people
21st-century American chemists
Central College (Iowa) alumni
Cornell University faculty
Indiana University alumni
National Medal of Science laureates
People from Geneva, New York
People from Orange City, Iowa
Scientists from New York (state)
Wolf Prize in Agriculture laureates
Chemical ecologists